Ossos (English: "Bones") is a 1997 Portuguese film directed by Pedro Costa.

The film was shot in the Fontainhas district of Lisbon (also known as "Estrela d'Africa"), where disadvantaged dwellers and immigrants from former Portuguese colonies in Africa live desperate lives.

This drama film with some documentary elements made Pedro Costa acclaimed internationally. It was nominated for Golden Lion and won the best cinematography (Golden Osella) at the Venice International Film Festival in 1997.

He further dealt with the now-defunct shanty district in his next two films, In Vanda's Room (2000) and Colossal Youth (2006).

Plot 
The film focuses on the interactions among four characters: Clotilde and Tina are close friends and neighbors living in the depressed Fontainhas district. Clotilde is very protective of the suicidal Tina, who has a newborn baby with an unnamed deadbeat father. Eduarda is a nurse living in a better working-class area. She meets the father and the baby by chance, and gets to know Clotilde and Tina as a result. Their ambiguous relationship keeps this downbeat story moving around the shanty town. 

The director's ascetic style and this district's faded cityscape further stress the depressing tone of the film. Through the lenses of Pedro Costa and Emmanuel Machuel, Ossos records a tale of young lives torn apart at a devastated community.

Cast 

 Vanda Duarte as Clotilde
 Nuno Vaz as The father 
 Maria Lipkina as Tina 
 Isabel Ruth as Eduarda 
 Inês Medeiros as Whore 
 Miguel Sermão as Clotilde's husband 
 Berta Susana Teixeira as Nurse

Credits 

 Director: Pedro Costa 
 Writer: Pedro Costa 
 Producer: Paolo Branco 
 Cinematography: Emmanuel Machuel 
 Costume design: Isabel Favila 
 Production design: Zé Branco 
 Sound: Henri Maikoff 
 Sound: Gérard Rousseau 
 Editing: Jackie Bastide

Home video 
This film, together with In Vanda's Room (2000) and Colossal Youth (2006), is released by the Criterion Collection in a box set Letters from Fontainhas: Three Films by Pedro Costa.

See also 
 In Vanda's Room
 Colossal Youth
 Docufiction
 List of docufiction films
 Ethnofiction
 Cinéma vérité

References

External links
 
 
 Podcast with Pedro Costa (on the "Letters from Fontainhas" Criterion DVD set, 2010), GreenCine Daily
Pedro Costa’s Fontainhas Trilogy: Rooms for the Living and the Dead an essay by Cyril Neyrat at the Criterion Collection

1997 films
1997 drama films
Portuguese drama films
1990s Portuguese-language films
Films about immigration
Films about race and ethnicity
Films set in Lisbon
Films directed by Pedro Costa
Films produced by Paulo Branco
Ethnofiction films
Films shot in Lisbon